The Ladies Swiss Classic was a women's professional golf tournament on the Ladies European Tour held in Switzerland. It was played in 1988 and 1989 near St. Moritz and in 1990 near Geneva.

The LET returned to Switzerland for the Ladies Swiss Open in 1996.

Winners

Source:

See also
Ladies Swiss Open

References

External links
Ladies European Tour

Former Ladies European Tour events
Golf tournaments in Switzerland
Defunct sports competitions in Switzerland